Events in the year 1706 in Norway.

Incumbents
Monarch: Frederick IV

Events

Arts and literature

Births

15 August - Benjamin Dass, educator and book collector (died 1775).

Deaths
7 February – Didrik Muus, priest, painter, copper engraver (born 1633).

See also

References